Dobrivoje Velemir (born 14 March 1997) is a Serbian football winger who currently plays for Tekstilac Odžaci.

Career
On 29 January 2021, Velemir signed for Noah, leaving the club on 21 December 2021.

References

External links
 
 
 

1997 births
Living people
Association football forwards
Serbian footballers
OFK Bačka players
Serbian First League players
Serbian SuperLiga players
Footballers from Novi Sad
FK Sloboda Užice players
FK Cement Beočin players
FK Kabel players
FC Noah players
Expatriate footballers in Armenia
Serbian expatriate sportspeople in Armenia
Armenian Premier League players